Jake O'Brien may refer to:

Jake O'Brien (basketball), American basketball player
Jake O'Brien (fighter), American martial artist
Jake O'Brien (footballer), Irish footballer